The Devil is Driving is a 1932 American pre-Code film directed by Benjamin Stoloff and starring Edmund Lowe. The film's title was typical of the sensationalistic titles of many pre-Code films. It runs a mere 63 minutes, and like many Pre-Code movies deals openly with issues like sex and violence. Lowe plays a chronic gambler who drifts into a life of crime. The New York Times gave the film a mixed review upon its release.<ref name="NYT">Hall, Mordaunt. The Devil Is Driving (1932) Edmund Lowe and Wynne Gibson in a Story Dealing With the Activities of Automobile Thieves, The New York Times, December 16, 1932, accessed October 13, 2010.</ref>

Plot
Orville "Gabby" Denton is an alcoholic drifter with a chronic gambling problem. Despite his flaws he is beloved by his family.  Gabby's brother-in-law Beef gets Gabby work as a mechanic at the Metropolitan Garage. The shop is a front to a stolen car ring. Beef, who is otherwise honest, is aware of this. One day, Gabby is sent to pick up Silver, Jenkins's girl friend, whose car has broken down. They start a relationship and Silver leaves Jenkins. During a getaway, one of car thieves hits Gabby's nephew Buddy, who is in the street driving a toy car. The driver makes it to the garage, and Buddy receives treatment at a hospital. A witness points out the car to Gabby, and he understands it's the car that drove into the garage to be repainted. He investigates and discovers a piece of Buddy's little car in the wheel of the stolen car. When he confronts Beef, Beef gets drunk and confronts Jenkins and the head of the stolen car ring. They kill Beef and make his death look accidental. Photographer Bill Jones gives Gabby a photograph of Beef in the car before the accident, which shows Beef was already dead. Silver and Gabby confront Jenkins. The criminals drive away, but die in a car crash. With the hoodlums out of the way, Gabby marries Silver.

Cast
Edmund Lowe as 'Gabby' Denton
Wynne Gibson as 'Silver'
James Gleason as 'Beef' Evans
Lois Wilson as Nancy Evans
Alan Dinehart as Jenkins 
Dickie Moore as 'Buddy' Evans
George Rosener as The Dummy
Guinn "Big Boy" Williams as Mac

Reception
Mordaunt Hall of The New York Times praised the  performances of the actors and the film's brisk pace, but found the story highly implausible. Allmovie gave the film a positive review stating that the picture provided a few genuine surprises and moved quickly.

Notes

References
Doherty, Thomas Patrick. Pre-Code Hollywood: Sex, Immorality, and Insurrection in American Cinema 1930-1934''. New York: Columbia University Press 1999.

External links

1932 films
1932 drama films
American drama films
Films directed by Benjamin Stoloff
American black-and-white films
Paramount Pictures films
Films scored by Karl Hajos
1930s American films
1930s English-language films